The Teleport is a suburban-style 100-acre business park east of New York State Route 440 and west of the Bulls Head neighborhood of Staten Island in New York City. It includes five Class A office and specialized buildings totaling 700,000 square feet, as well as additional development-ready sites.

The Teleport was developed in the mid-1980s by the government of New York City and the Port Authority of New York and New Jersey (PANYNJ), which manages it under contract to the city, focusing on new technologies and offering high-speed voice, data and video services via satellite and fiber optic connectivity.

In 2001 AT&T, the Teleport's biggest tenant, moved 4,000 employees out of two office buildings on the site. They were sold in 2009 to the Nicotra Group, LLC and renamed Corporate Commons, with a major tenant being the St Paul's School of Nursing.

The New York City Economic Development Corporation and the PANYNJ retain control over the available development acreage.

See also
Telehouse America
Teleport Communications Group
West Shore, Staten Island

References 

Buildings and structures in Staten Island
Port Authority of New York and New Jersey
Business parks of the United States
Neighborhoods in Staten Island